"Hold You Down" is a 2004 song by The Alchemist from 1st Infantry, featuring  Prodigy, Illa Ghee, and Nina Sky. The song contains a sample from "Love Theme" by Al Kooper.

"Hold You Down" peaked at number 95 on the Billboard Hot 100 and number 47 on the Hot R&B/Hip-Hop Singles & Tracks chart.

The music video was directed by Estevan Oriol.

Track list
A Hold You Down (Clean)  
B1 Hold You Down (Dirty)
B2 Hold You Down (Instrumental)

References

External links
Music video on VH1.com

2004 songs
Nina Sky songs
2004 singles
American hip hop songs
Song recordings produced by the Alchemist (musician)
Songs written by The Alchemist (musician)
Songs written by Prodigy (rapper)